Line Corporation is a Tokyo-based subsidiary of Z Holdings, which is jointly owned by Softbank Group and Naver Corporation. The company's business is mainly associated with the development of mobile applications and Internet services, particularly the Line communication app.

History
Line Corporation was founded on September 4, 2000, as Hangame Japan as a part of Hangame, a South Korean game company owned by NHN at the time. In August 2003, the company was renamed to NHN Japan.

In 2007 Naver established another Japanese subsidiary Naver Japan, which managed the Naver search engine in Japan before its demise. Naver Japan acquire Livedoor in 2010.

In 2012, Naver merged the three entities (NHN Japan, Naver Japan, Livedoor) into a new subsidiary known as NHN Japan.

On April 1, 2013, the company changed its name and traded as Line Corporation. Later that same year, NHN split into two companies, Naver Corporation and NHN Entertainment Corporation and the latter created a new NHN Japan Corporation subsidiary.

In July 2016, Line Corporation held IPOs on both the New York Stock Exchange and the Tokyo Stock Exchange.

In late December 2020, Line delisted from both the New York Stock Exchange and the Tokyo Stock Exchange, in advance of its absorption-type merger agreement with Z Holdings.

In March 2021 Line Corporation merged with Yahoo Japan, which has been operated by Z Holdings, a SoftBank Group subsidiary. Under the new structure, Naver Corporation (Line's former parent company) and SoftBank Corp. (the wireless carrier unit of SoftBank Group) each hold 50 percent stakes in a new company named A Holdings Corp., which holds a majority stake in Z Holdings, which will operate Line and Yahoo Japan. Upon integrating the two businesses and creating further platforms, the merged company aims to compete with the U.S. tech giants Google, Amazon, Facebook, and Apple and the Chinese tech giants Baidu, Alibaba, and Tencent, as well as the Japanese e-commerce giant Rakuten. The merger also gives Z Holdings three additional Asian markets where Line is popular: Taiwan, Thailand, and Indonesia.

In December 2021, Line Corporation established LINE NEXT to launch NFT marketplace.

References

External links

Line
Naver Japan
Livedoor
Clova Cloud Virtual Assistant by NAVER/LINE

Naver Corporation
South Korean brands
Internet in Japan
Z Holdings
Telecommunications companies based in Tokyo
Internet search engines
Companies formerly listed on the Tokyo Stock Exchange
Companies formerly listed on the New York Stock Exchange
Japanese companies established in 2000
Telecommunications companies established in 2000
2016 initial public offerings
2021 mergers and acquisitions